Steve Parry (born 19 October 1988) is a Welsh professional rugby league footballer who plays for the West Wales Raiders in Betfred League 1, and at representative level for Wales.

Club career
Steve started playing rugby league at Cardiff Demons as a junior. Steve Parry scored his first try for the South Wales Scorpions against Workington Town in the Scorpions first ever match.

International honours
Steve Parry won 3 caps for Wales while at South Wales Scorpions. He made more appearances for Wales in the 2015 European Cup tournament, a tournament which saw him score his first international try.

In October 2016, Steve played for Wales in the 2017 World Cup qualifiers.

References

External links
(archived by web.archive.org) Profile at scorpionsrl.com
(archived by web.archive.org) Scorpions Squad
(archived by web.archive.org) Statistics at rlwc2017.com

1988 births
Living people
Gloucestershire All Golds players
Rugby league five-eighths
Rugby league players from Merthyr Tydfil
South Wales Scorpions players
Wales national rugby league team players
Welsh rugby league players